All Y'All is Travis Morrison's second solo album, credited to the Travis Morrison Hellfighters. It was released on August 21, 2007 by Barsuk Records.

Production
According to Travis Morrison:
The record was written mostly in early 2005, and then after some unsatisfactory attempts to record them, me and the Hellfighters stopped working on it. I started singing in church choirs, working for volunteer organizations here in DC, and did some travelling. We reconvened in Chicago in the fall of 2006 and recorded the songs with Jason Caddell, who was a bandmate of mine in the Dismemberment Plan, at the Chicago Recording Company. It was mixed by Jason and Joel Hamilton.

Track listing
 "I'm Not Supposed to Like You (But)" - 2:03
 "As We Proceed" - 3:19
 "Catch Up" - 4:35
 "East Side of the River" - 3:25
 "I Do" - 3:24
 "Just Didn't Turn Me On" - 3:26
 "You Make Me Feel Like a Freak" - 4:28
 "Hawkins' Rock" - 3:56
 "Churchgoer" - 4:02
 "Book of Names" - 4:12
 "Saturday Night" - 4:59

Personnel
 The Hellfighters: Saadat Awan, David Brown, Brandon Kalber & Travis Morrison
 Ken Thomson: Saxophone on "You Make Me Feel Like A Freak", "I'm Not Supposed To Like You (But)" and "East Side of the River"
 Jean Cook: Violin on "East Side of the River"
 Art/Design: Jewboy Corporation

References

2007 albums